The James Allen Stone Barn is a historic building located on a farm southeast of Earlham, Iowa, United States.  Allen acquired  in 1855, and is thought to have built this barn to house his draft stallions.  The single-story, one-room structure is composed of locally quarried rubble stone.  The entrance on the east side and a window on the west side both have arched openings.  The interior had four stalls for the horses.  Frame lean-tos were added to the north and south elevations at a later date.  The barn was listed on the National Register of Historic Places in 1987.

References

Infrastructure completed in 1856
Vernacular architecture in Iowa
Buildings and structures in Madison County, Iowa
National Register of Historic Places in Madison County, Iowa
Barns on the National Register of Historic Places in Iowa
1856 establishments in Iowa